Brain Bowl is an academic competition in which Florida Community College teams are pitted against one another. Teams consist of up to six players, only four of whom play at any given time.  A moderator reads questions from four subject areas including humanities, mathematics, natural science and social sciences.  Each area is equally represented.  A buzzer system is used to identify the player who answers first. Ten points are awarded for correctly answering the tossup question.  The team winning the tossup is eligible to win up to 30 points for correctly answering the follow-up bonus questions.  After 24 questions, the team that has accumulated the most points wins the game. No questions about popular culture or media are used in Brain Bowl.

Florida Brain Bowl Purpose

The purpose of Brain Bowl competition is to recognize outstanding student academic achievement, to help focus community interest on academic excellence in Florida community colleges and to help foster relations among faculty and students as they work together on this joint project.

History and Scholarships

Florida Brain Bowl was created in the fall of 1981 and until 1991 was a joint project of the Florida State Department of Education and the Florida College System Activities Association (FCSAA). Since 1991, the FCSAA has been the sole sponsor of the Brain Bowl.

After initially gaining the approval and support of the Florida Community College Council of Presidents, the fall of 1981 was spent developing rules and organizing regional competitions. The cash awards for the initial year came from a combination of funds from the legislative appropriation that established the Program to Recognize Initiative and Distinction in Education (PRIDE) and more than $12,000 that the founders of the Brain Bowl competition were able to raise from private sources.

Since its inception in 1981, the Florida Community Colleges Brain Bowl competition has involved more than 1,000 students in regional and state competitions. During that time,  the Florida Department of Education has awarded more than $80,000 to community college students who have competed in these tournaments.  Private colleges and universities, as well as state supported universities, have made available almost $1 million worth of scholarship opportunities. Each year the host school records the Championship match for future broadcast to the television viewers in the State of Florida.

Tournament History

Brain Bowl Tournament winners are:

1982: Florida State College at Jacksonville

1983: Florida State College at Jacksonville

1984: St. Petersburg College

1985: Miami Dade College -South Campus

1986: Seminole State College of Florida

1987: Miami Dade College -South Campus

1988: Florida State College at Jacksonville

1989: Broward College

1990: Broward College

1991: Broward College

1992: Broward College

1993: Broward College

1994: Valencia College

1995: Valencia College

1996: College of Central Florida

1997: Broward College

1998: Broward College

1999: Valencia College

2000: Tallahassee Community College

2001: Valencia College

2002: Pensacola State College

2003: Valencia College

2004: Northwest Florida State College

2005: Northwest Florida State College

2006: Broward College

2007: Northwest Florida State College

2008: Chipola College

2009: Chipola College

2010: Chipola College

2011: Chipola College

2012: Chipola College

2013: Chipola College

2014: Chipola College

2015: State College of Florida

2016: State College of Florida

2017: Valencia College

2018: Chipola College

2019: Chipola College

Florida College System Activities Association (FCSAA)
Brain Bowl 
Brain Bowl Coaches list

Teams

Panhandle Region Teams

Chipola College

Gulf Coast State College

Pensacola State College

North Florida Community College

Northwest Florida State College

Tallahassee Community College

Florida Gateway College (formerly Lake City Community College)

East Central Region Teams

Eastern Florida State College

College of Central Florida

Florida State College Jacksonville

Lake-Sumter State College

Santa Fe College

Seminole State College of Florida

West Central Region Teams

Hillsborough Community College

State College of Florida, Manatee–Sarasota

Polk State College

South Florida State College

Valencia College

St. Petersburg College

Pasco–Hernando State College

Southern Region Teams

Broward College

Florida Keys Community College

Indian River State College

Palm Beach State College

Miami Dade College

References 

Student quiz competitions